George Albert Enright (born May 9, 1954) is a former catcher in Major League Baseball. He played for the Chicago White Sox in 1976.

References

External links

1954 births
Living people
Appleton Foxes players
Baseball players from Connecticut
Chicago White Sox players
Gulf Coast White Sox players
Iowa Oaks players
Jacksonville Suns players
Knoxville Sox players
Major League Baseball catchers
Midland Cubs players
Minor league baseball managers
Omaha Royals players
Sportspeople from New Britain, Connecticut
Tiburones de La Guaira players
American expatriate baseball players in Venezuela
Wichita Aeros players